The 2018–19 Belgian First Division A (officially known as Jupiler Pro League) was the 116th season of top-tier football in Belgium.

Team changes
 Mechelen was relegated after finishing last in the 2017–18 Belgian First Division A, ending a streak of 11 seasons at the highest level.
 Cercle Brugge was promoted after winning the promotion play-offs against Beerschot Wilrijk. The club returns to the highest tier three seasons after relegation from the Belgian Pro League in 2014–15.

Teams

Stadiums and locations

Personnel and kits

Managerial changes

Regular season

League table

Results

Championship play-offs
The points obtained during the regular season were halved (and rounded up) before the start of the playoff. As a result, the teams started with the following points before the playoff: Genk 32 points, Club Brugge 28, Standard Liège 27, Anderlecht 26, Gent 25 and Antwerp 25. The points of Genk, Standard Liège, Anderlecht and Antwerp were rounded up, therefore in case of any ties on points at the end of the playoffs, the half point will be deducted for these teams.

League table

Europa League play-offs
Group A of the play-offs consist of the teams finishing in positions 7, 9, 12 and 14 during the regular season and the first and third placed team in the qualifying positions in the 2018–19 Belgian First Division B. The teams finishing in positions 8, 10, 11, 13 and 15 were joined by the second placed qualifier from the 2018–19 Belgian First Division B in group B.

Group A

Group B

Semi-final
The winners of both play-off groups competed in one match to play the fourth-placed team of the championship play-offs for a spot in the final. This match was played on the field of the highest ranked team in the regular competition. Charleroi advanced to the final to play for a spot in the second qualifying round of the 2019–20 UEFA Europa League.

Final
The winner of the Europa League play-off semi-final and the fourth-placed team of the championship play-offs played one match to determine the Europa League play-off winner. Antwerp qualified for the third qualifying round of the 2019–20 UEFA Europa League.

Number of teams by provinces

Season statistics

Top scorers

Top assists

Clean sheets

Notes

References

Belgian Pro League seasons
Belgian First Division A
1